Albert Palm (1915 – 1982) was an Australian international lawn bowler. When he played he was known as Bert Palm.

Bowls career
Palm took part in the Lawn Bowls at the 1950 British Empire Games. He competed in the first World Bowls Championship in Kyeemagh, New South Wales, Australia in 1966  and won a gold medal in the pairs with Geoff Kelly and a silver in the fours. He also won a gold medal in the team event (Leonard Trophy).

He won the 1949 pairs title at the Australian National Bowls Championships  when bowling for the Bundaberg Bowls Club.

References

1915 births
1982 deaths
Australian male bowls players
Bowls World Champions